Elections to Metropolitan Borough of Southwark were held in 1934.

The borough had ten wards which returned between 3 and 9 members. Labour won all the seats, bar one. This was the last Council until abolition in 1964 that had an opposition councillor.

The Ratepayers Association was an "anti-socialist alliance" which later changed its name to the Municipal Progressives. They should not be confused with Municipal Reform who were the Conservatives.

Election result

|}

References

Council elections in the London Borough of Southwark
1934 in London
1934 English local elections